Claire Harman is a British actress and narrator, known for narrating the ITV series Dickinson's Real Deal. She also portrayed the lead role in the Brookside DVD Unfinished Business. She has also had a starring role in the second series of Sky TV's Is Harry on the Boat. Harman's other TV credits include Casualty, Doctors, Merseybeat and Coronation Street. Her film credits include About a Boy and Last Orders.

Filmography

Film

Television

References

External links
 

English soap opera actresses
English television actresses
English voice actresses
Living people
Year of birth missing (living people)